Stevan Redli (born 11 December 1930) is a Yugoslav former boxer. He competed in the men's featherweight event at the 1952 Summer Olympics.

References

External links
  

1930 births
Possibly living people
Yugoslav male boxers
Olympic boxers of Yugoslavia
Boxers at the 1952 Summer Olympics
Featherweight boxers